Aure may refer to:

Places

France
 Aure, Ardennes, a commune of the Ardennes département
 Aure (river), a river in northwestern France

Norway
 Aure, Norway, a municipality in Møre og Romsdal county
 Aure (village), a village in Aure Municipality, Møre og Romsdal county
 Aure, Sykkylven, a village in Sykkylven, Møre og Romsdal county

People
 Aud Inger Aure, a Norwegian politician for the Christian People's Party
 Aure Atika, a French actress, writer and director

Other
 Aure et Saint-Girons, a French breed of cattle